Graham William Bent (6 October 1945 – 15 May 2002) was a Welsh professional footballer, who played as a winger. He came up through the youth team at Aston Villa, but didn't make an appearance at the club, however he did make appearances in the English Football League for Wrexham.

References

1945 births
2002 deaths
People from Ruabon
Sportspeople from Wrexham County Borough
Welsh footballers
Association football wingers
Aston Villa F.C. players
Wrexham A.F.C. players
Dudley Town F.C. players
English Football League players